U and non-U English usage, where "U" stands for upper class, and "non-U" represents the aspiring middle classes, was part of the terminology of popular discourse of social dialects (sociolects) in Britain in the 1950s. The different vocabularies can often appear quite counter-intuitive: the middle classes prefer "fancy" or fashionable words, even neologisms and often euphemisms, in attempts to make themselves sound more refined ("posher than posh"), while the upper classes in many cases stick to the same plain and traditional words that the working classes also use, as, confident in the security of their social position, they have no need to seek to display refinement.

History 

The discussion was set in motion in 1954 by the British linguist Alan S. C. Ross, professor of linguistics in the University of Birmingham. He coined the terms "U" and "non-U" in an article on the differences that social class makes in English language usage published in a Finnish professional linguistics journal.  Though his article included differences in pronunciation and writing styles, it was his remark about differences of vocabulary that received the most attention.

The upper class English author Nancy Mitford was alerted and immediately took up the usage in an essay, "The English Aristocracy", which Stephen Spender published in his magazine Encounter in 1954. Mitford provided a glossary of terms used by the upper classes (some appear in the table), unleashing an anxious national debate about English class-consciousness and snobbery, which involved a good deal of soul-searching that itself provided fuel for the fires. The essay was reprinted, with contributions by Evelyn Waugh, John Betjeman, and others, as well as a "condensed and simplified version" of Ross's original article, as Noblesse Oblige: an Enquiry into the Identifiable Characteristics of the English Aristocracy in 1956. Betjeman's poem "How to Get On in Society" concluded the collection.

The issue of U and non-U could have been taken lightheartedly, but at the time many took it very seriously. This was a reflection of the anxieties of the middle class in Britain of the 1950s, recently emerged from post-war austerities. In particular the media used it as a launch pad for many stories, making much more out of it than was first intended. In the meantime, the idea that one might "improve oneself" by adopting the culture and manner of one's "betters", instinctively assented to before World War II, was now greeted with resentment.

Some of the terms and the ideas behind them were largely obsolete by the late 20th century, when, in the United Kingdom, reverse snobbery led younger members of the British upper and middle classes to adopt elements of working class speech, such as Estuary English or Mockney. However, many, if not most, of the differences remain very much current, and can therefore continue to be used as class indicators.

American usage

A study in 1940 on the speaking differences between the American upper and middle classes revealed a strong similarity with the results of Ross's research. For instance, the American upper class said 'curtains', whilst the middle class used 'drapes'. Notably, the well-heeled would use 'toilet' whereas the less well-heeled would say 'lavatory', an inversion of the British usage.

See also
Shibboleth
Countersignalling

References

Further reading
 Mitford, Nancy (ed.). Noblesse oblige. Hamish Hamilton, London, 1956. Reprinted Oxford : Oxford University Press, 2002, .
 Fox, Kate. Watching the English: The Hidden Rules of English Behaviour. Hodder & Stoughton, London, 2004. 
 Cooper, Jilly. Class. Corgi Adult, 1999. 
 Alan S C Ross. How to pronounce it. Hamish Hamilton, London, 1970. SBN 241 01967 2
 Alan S C Ross. Don't say it. Hamish Hamilton 1973, 
 Charlotte Mosley (ed.) The Letters of Nancy Mitford and Evelyn Waugh.  Hodder, London, 1996, at pp. 297–394.

External links
Ross, Alan S. C.,  Linguistic class-indicators in present-day English (6.15 MB PDF)

Sociolinguistics
Social class in the United Kingdom
Human communication
English language
1950s in the United Kingdom